Spy Fox 3: "Operation Ozone" is the third and final game in the Spy Fox series of games developed by Humongous Entertainment and marketed by Infogrames.

Plot

While undercover in the Scottish Highlands, Spy Fox (voiced by Mike Madeoy) ends up in a bathroom in a hideout with a bunch of bunnies. Roger Boar, an informant, gives Fox a rocket-powered origami skateboard sent by Professor Quack and a message hidden inside a lipstick container. After folding the skateboard correctly, Spy Fox is able to use it to escape from the bunny guards. After escaping, the scene switches to a giant aerosol can spraying on the ozone layer. After the Spy Chief is told about this, Spy Fox arrives with the message in the lipstick saying, "Please help me. Signed, Plato Pushpin". The Chief gives Fox the number of a jukebox song to play (in the form of as teabag) so the latter can get into the Mobile Command Center.

Spy Fox is sent to the Middle of Nowhere. After punching the number in the jukebox in the bowling alley, Fox hops into a bowling pin and is sent to MobCom (short for Mobile Command Center), which is above the bowling alley. Monkey Penny informs Spy Fox that Plato Pushpin, the cosmetics expert, has been captured by Poodles Galore, the self-appointed Queen of Cosmetics. After disguising as one of Poodles' bowlers, Spy Fox rescues Pushpin, who gives him a list of items needed to create the congeal pill (which includes an unchewed wad of chicle and the Aerosol Particle Diameter Number (or A.P.D. for short) outside the Aerosol can itself) to disarm Poodle's hairspray can, which Poodles plans to use to deplete the ozone layer so everyone will buy her SPF 2001 Sunscreen.

When Spy Fox gives Pushpin all the vital ingredients, Pushpin is able to complete the congeal pill. Spy Fox enters the spray can, but Poodles stops Fox right before the pill can touch the aerosol and traps him in a steel net. After using wire cutters that can cut through solid steel (which Professor Quack gave him earlier), Fox is able to free himself, take back the congeal pill (without Poodles noticing) and throw the pill into the aerosol. The can explodes, but gives just enough time for Poodles and Fox to escape.

In a bonus ending, Spy Fox follows Poodles to her moonbase, where she uses an impenetrable force field, so no one can meddle with her Plan B, but not before Spy Fox enters. He sneaks into a room with a surveillance monitor (after deactivating a booby trap), which shows a close-up of Poodles Galore's fingernails, so he can paint his fingernails exactly like hers to complete the fingernail code and turn the force field off. Afterwards, Monkey Penny is able to come right in and send Poodles away to jail. In the end, Spy Fox talks to the Chief about getting a vacation saying that he's "dog tired".

Reception

Commercial performance 
The game was the fifth Top Selling Home Education Software for the week of 5/06/2001-5/12/2001, third for 5/13/2001-5/19/2001, fourth for 5/27/2001-6/2/2001, and third for 6/3/2001-6/9/2001, according to PC Data.

In North America alone, Spy Fox 3 sold 77,133 copies during the year 2001.

Reviews
Review Corner gave the game a score of 4.5 stars and in addition an Award of Excellence.

References

External links
 
 Spy Fox 3: "Operation Ozone" at Humongous Entertainment

2001 video games
Adventure games
Children's educational video games
Point-and-click adventure games
Single-player video games
Spy Fox
IOS games
Linux games
Windows games
Infogrames games
Classic Mac OS games
ScummVM-supported games
Android (operating system) games
Video games about foxes
Video games set in Scotland
Video games developed in the United States
Tommo games
Video games with alternate endings